This is a list of the governors of the province of Nuristan, Afghanistan.

Governors of Nuristan Province

See also
 List of current governors of Afghanistan

Notes

Nuristan